The Otahuhu by-election 1963 was a by-election held in the  electorate in Auckland during the term of the 33rd New Zealand Parliament, on 16 March 1963.

Background
The by-election was caused by the death of incumbent MP James Deas of the Labour Party on 27 January 1963. It was held the same day as the Northern Maori by-election.

Candidates

Communist
The Communist Party chose trade unionist Stan Hieatt, who contested the Otahuhu seat in 1960, as their candidate once again.

Labour
As the Otahuhu electorate was scheduled for abolition at the end of the parliamentary session so the selection for the by-election candidate was also set to choose the candidate for the to be created  electorate.

National
The National Party chose Thomas Tucker a local taxation consultant, who contested Otahuhu in 1960, as their candidate. He won selection in preference to Lloyd Elsmore, the Mayor of Ellerslie, and Ray Presland, who stood for National in  electorate in 1960.

Social Credit
The Social Credit Party decided not to contest the election. Party leader Vernon Cracknell said that the election was pointless and a misappropriation of taxpayer funds due to the seat being scheduled for abolition. "The byelection in Otahuhu, a seat which will be abolished in a few months' time, is unnecessary and a waste of public money" said Cracknell.

Results
The following table gives the election results:

Aftermath
The by-election was won by Bob Tizard who represented it from 16 March to 29 October only. When the electorate was abolished and replaced by the  electorate at the  election, Tizard was elected for the Pakuranga seat instead.

Notes

References

Otahuhu 1963
1963 elections in New Zealand
Politics of the Auckland Region
1960s in Auckland
March 1963 events in New Zealand